During the 2007–08 season, the Gonzaga Bulldogs men's basketball team, from Gonzaga University in Washington state, played in the West Coast Conference and the Great Alaska Shootout. The team won 25 matches and lost 8, but lost in the first round of the 2008 NCAA Division I men's basketball tournament.

Preseason
Coach Mark Few hit the recruiting trail hard in the offseason with the Coach proclaiming it's "the best we've ever had here". Few managed to recruit sought-after forward Austin Daye, Junior College transfer Ira Brown, Robert Sacre (a 7-foot Center from Vancouver, British Columbia, Canada) and Steven Gray, a prized point/shooting guard. Also returning from a suspension would be the team's leading scorer from the season before Josh Heytvelt, and Theo Davis. The team entered the season ranked 14th in the AP Poll.

Departures

Incoming transfers

2007 recruiting class

Roster

Tournament build-up
Gonzaga received a 7 seed in the Midwest Region of the NCAA Tournament, and were paired against the 10 seed Davidson College, a sleeper pick by many experts. During the season the Bulldogs played ten teams that eventually made it to the tournament, and played a total of 13 games against teams who made it into the tournament. The Zags won seven of those thirteen games beating a 10 seed in Saint Mary's, a 13 seed in San Diego (Gonzaga won twice against San Diego), an 11 seed in Saint Joseph's, WKU, a 12 seed, a 14th seeded Georgia team, and a 4 seed in UConn. Gonzaga also lost six games against eventual tournament teams, they lost to Saint Mary's on the road, San Diego in the WCC Conference tournament, and also lost to a 1 seed in Memphis, a 2 seed in Tennessee, a 6th seeded Oklahoma Sooners team, and a 4 seed in Washington State at home.

Schedule

|-
!colspan=9| Regular Season

|-
!colspan=9| 2007 Great Alaska Shootout

|-
!colspan=9|

|-
!colspan=9| 2008 West Coast Conference tournament

|-
!colspan=9| NCAA Division I men's basketball tournament

References

Gonzaga
Gonzaga Bulldogs men's basketball seasons
Gonzaga
Gonzaga Bulldogs men's basketball
Gonzaga Bulldogs men's basketball